Herbert is a horizontally-scrolling platform game released for the Atari 8-bit family in 1988 by AMC Verlag. A sequel, Herbert II, was released in 1989.

Gameplay

The game world is shown from a side view and scrolls horizontally. The objective is to traverse 20 levels with one or two ducks (namely Herbert and his friend Oscar) to liberate his girlfriend. Herbert can walk, run, swim, and flap. He can lay an egg in a nest turning up once in a while and receives an extra life, and three times a level it is possible to trigger invulnerability for some seconds. Enemies are among others a witch, a sword fighter, thorns on bushes or carnivorous plants. To complete a level, Herbert has to collect gems and to reach the exit on the right within a time limit. There are storable best times for each level and a highscore list.

A level is a half screen high and about six screens wide.

Reception
In Germany, Herbert received good reviews, among others 91% in the Compy-Shop-Magazin and a very positive review in the Atari Magazin. It was one year in the Readers Top Ten of the Atari Magazin and achieved place 1 for three times. Outside Germany, the games are hardly known.

Legacy
The games were released as freeware in October 2003.

References

External links
Herbert at Atari Mania
Herbert 2 at Atari Mania

1988 video games
Side-scrolling platform games
Atari 8-bit family games
Atari 8-bit family-only games
Video games developed in Germany